William George Beattie (2 December 1841 – 28 May 1918) was an English locomotive engineer. He was born in Lambeth, London the son of Joseph Hamilton Beattie. He joined the London and South Western Railway in 1862 as a draughtsman at Nine Elms Locomotive Works. He succeeded his father as Locomotive Engineer of the LSWR following Joseph's death in 1871. He was not however a success in this post and was forced to resign in 1878.

Locomotive classes
W.G. Beattie perpetuated five of his father's designs, but with modifications. He also introduced five classes of his own design.

References

1841 births
1918 deaths
English engineers
Locomotive builders and designers
Locomotive superintendents
London and South Western Railway people
English railway mechanical engineers
19th-century British engineers